The Robert C. Byrd Biotechnology Science Center biotechnology research and teaching structure on the campus of Marshall University along 3rd Avenue in Huntington, West Virginia. It is named after longtime U.S. Senator Robert C. Byrd, who was a proponent for the project and helped receive funding for its construction.

The first floor contains two auditoriums, six teaching laboratories, numerous lecture rooms and other research appendages. The second floor is tailored to the College of Science, where labs for biotechnology research and teaching will reside alongside "student study spaces." There are also seminar rooms and numerous student and faculty offices.

History 
To obtain funding for the Biotechnology Science Center, Robert C. Byrd requested $35.6 million in Congressional appropriations.

The . four-story facility  opened in January 2007 at a cost of $48 million. The complex united undergraduate and graduate students from the College of Science and medical school students, along with faculty and researchers. Many of the researchers and faculty were separated from the main campus by as much as eight miles (13 km) at the Veterans Administration Hospital in Spring Valley.

The Biotechnology Science Center was one of two buildings proposed north of 3rd Avenue. The other, still in planning stages, will house the College of Information Technology, the Center for Environmental and Geotechnical Applied Sciences, a development center and a visualization resource center. The latter will host students and faculty who work on three-dimensional modeling, animation and simulation technologies, and would complement the Biotechnology Science Center and the new engineering program at the university. The $35 million structure would also include an incubator for startup businesses for the biotechnology field.

See also 
 Buildings at Marshall University
 Cityscape of Huntington, West Virginia
 Marshall University

References

External links 

Marshall University
Buildings and structures in Huntington, West Virginia